Benjamin Kern (born 5 November 1983) is a German footballer, who plays for TSG Young Boys Reutlingen.

Career
He has played for FC Augsburg. After being released he signed a loan contract for Rot Weiss Ahlen in January 2010.

References

External links
 

1983 births
Living people
German footballers
SV Darmstadt 98 players
FC Augsburg players
MSV Duisburg players
2. Bundesliga players
Association football midfielders
People from Göppingen
Sportspeople from Stuttgart (region)
Footballers from Baden-Württemberg